Vityaz may refer to:
 Bogatyr, a folk or epic hero in Slavic culture

Aircraft and spacecraft
Vityaz, the call sign of spacecraft Soyuz TM-14
Russky Vityaz, an aircraft built by Igor Sikorsky in 1913

Military
 , a Bogatyr class screw corvette

Vityaz (MVD), a Russian Spetsnaz (special forces) unit 
Vityaz (ATV), a Russian all-terrain vehicle
S-350 Vityaz, a Russian surface-to-air missile defense system
Vityaz-SN, a Russian 9mm Parabellum submachine-gun

Sport
FC Vityaz Podolsk, a football club in Podolsk, Russia
Vityaz Ice Palace, an ice arena in Podolsk, Russia
Vityaz Chekhov, a professional ice hockey team in Chekhov, Moscow Oblast, formerly in Podolsk, Russia

Other uses
Vityaz, a historical association in the Soviet Union, precursor of Pamyat
Machine engineering company 'Vityaz', a tracked amphibious vehicle manufacturer
Vityaz' frostfish, the common name of Benthodesmus vityazi, a species of cutlassfish
, a Soviet research vessel in service 1949-79, now a museum ship
, a Russian tanker reportedly used to supply North Korea with petroleum
Vitiaz Strait, between Long Island and New Guinea
Vitiaz languages, a group of Austronesian languages
71-931 "Vityaz", three-section tram cars of 71-931 and 71-931М ("Vityaz-M") models produced on  LLC "PC Transport Systems"